Argia infrequentula is a species of dragonfly from the family Coenagrionidae and the genus Argia. Found in South America and it was described by Frederic Charles Fraser in 1946.

References 

Coenagrionidae
Insects described in 1946